Beautiful World Tour, also known as Monsta X World Tour: Beautiful, is the first worldwide concert tour by the South Korean boy group Monsta X following the group's sold out Asian concert tour The First Live: X-Clan Origins. The tour commenced on June 17, three months after the release of the group's first studio album The Clan Pt. 2.5: The Final Chapter, kicking off in Seoul, then visiting other ten countries including Hong Kong, United States, Thailand, France, Germany, Russia, Taiwan, Argentina, Chile, and Mexico.

Background

Asia
On April 28, the group's official Twitter account revealed a poster for their first world tour, announcing that the first show would be held in Seoul. Their tour started on June 17 and June 18, at the Olympic Hall, located at Seoul Olympic Park. On May 18, the group's agency Starship Entertainment revealed that the tickets for the two Seoul concerts had been completely sold out, within a minute after going on sale, setting the record of "sold out tickets" for two consecutive years.

On July 7, Monsta X’s fan cafe updated with a message from Starship Entertainment that first included an apology to fans for having to convey bad news ahead of the world tour. According to their agency, a small wound and swelling was discovered on Hyungwon's knee, and following an examination, was diagnosed with the early stages of cellulitis. The agency also added that Hyungwon would be focusing on rest and treatment so that he can recover quickly.

The group was supposed to visit Indonesia for the tour, but their promoter SH Entertainment cancelled their performance due to "local circumstances".

Americas
Monsta X finished their tour in North America on July 23 and 24 at The Novo in Los Angeles. According to Starship Entertainment, the tour was attended by total of 20,000 fans in New York, Atlanta, Dallas, San Francisco, and Los Angeles. The group's agency also added that the six concerts in the five cities were completely sold out, including the belatedly added Monday concert in Los Angeles, while having Mexico on September 17 as the last stop for this tour. The group also had some interviews from well-known media platforms, such as Billboard and IHeartRadio. 

The group finished their tour in South America, performing in Argentina at Estadio Luna Park on September 12 and in Chile at Movistar Arena on September 14.

Europe
Monsta X had three stops for the tour in Europe, Paris on August 9, Berlin on August 11, and Moscow on August 13.

Setlist

 "Beautiful"                                                                        
 "Incomparable"                                                                                      
 "Hero" 
MENT                                                                                                                                        
 "I Need U"                                                                         
 "All I Do"                                                                                     
 "Ex Girl"                                                                                            
 "White Love" 
MENT                                             
 "Ready or Not"                                                                                                                                                           
 "Oi"  
VCR              
 "From Zero" – Wonho and Hyungwon              
 "Beautiful" (Remix) – Hyungwon (as DJ H.One)                                    
 "Bam!Bam!Bam!" – Jooheon and Hyungwon (as DJ H.One)                                       
 "24K Magic" – Shownu, Minhyuk, and I.M
 "Mirror" – Kihyun and Jooheon  
MENT                                                                                                                                                                          
 "Honestly"
 "Roller Coaster"
 "I'll Be There" 
 "White Sugar" 

                                                                      
VCR
 "Sweetheart" 
 "Stuck"
 "Be Quiet"
MENT
 "Broken Heart"
 "Blind"
MENT
 "Shine Forever" 
MENT
 "All In"
 "Trespass"
 "Rush" (Remix)
MENT
 "Fighter"
ENCORE
 "No Exit"
ENDING MENT
 "5:14 (Last Page)"

Notes:
 included in the Seoul setlist only
 included in the International setlist only

Tour dates

Boxscore

Awards and nominations

References

External links
  

Monsta X concert tours
2017 concert tours
K-pop concerts
MAMA Award winners
Concert tours of Asia
Concert tours of Mexico
Concert tours of North America
Concert tours of South Korea
Concert tours of Thailand
Concert tours of the United States